Rybachy (masculine), Rybachya (feminine), or Rybachye (neuter) may refer to:
Rybachy Peninsula, a peninsula in Murmansk Oblast, Russia
Rybachy, Russia (Rybachya, Rybachye), several rural localities in Russia
Rybachy Island, an island in Tyuleny Archipelago, Kazakhstan
Rybachye, former name of the town of Balykchy, Kyrgyzstan
Rybache (Rybachye), a rural locality under administrative jurisdiction of the town of Alushta in Crimea